Alexander Gregory Grinch (born May 29, 1980) is an American football coach who serves as the defensive coordinator at the University of Southern California (USC). He previously served as defensive coordinator at the University of Oklahoma, Ohio State University and Washington State University. And is a four-time nominee for the Broyles Award (given to the nation’s top assistant coach) and was a semifinalist in 2017 and 2019. Grinch has also served as an assistant coach at the University of Missouri, the University of Wyoming, and the University of New Hampshire.

Playing career
Grinch played defensive back at Mount Union College from 1998 to 2001. During that time, Mount Union amassed a record of 54–1 and won three NCAA Division III Football Championships. Grinch graduated from Mount Union in 2002 with a bachelor's degree in sport management.

Coaching career

Missouri
From 2002 to 2004, Grinch was a graduate assistant under Gary Pinkel at the University of Missouri, and he completed his master's degree in educational leadership and policy analysis at Missouri in 2004.

New Hampshire
Grinch's first regular assistant coaching job was at Division I-AA New Hampshire under Sean McDonnell. In 2005 and 2006, Grinch was the cornerbacks coach. After a promotion, Grinch became the recruiting coordinator and coached the entire defensive secondary in 2007 and 2008.  Chip Kelly was the OC at New Hampshire and Grinch learned the value of practicing fast from competing against him every day.

Wyoming
Grinch spent three seasons at Wyoming as the recruiting coordinator and coaching the secondary.

Missouri (second stint)
Again working under Pinkel, Grinch coached the safeties at Missouri from 2012 to 2014.

Washington State
From 2015 to 2017, Grinch was the defensive coordinator and secondary coach at Washington State under Mike Leach.  In 2014, the year before his arrival at Washington State, the Cougars ranked 99th nationally in total defense (442.3 ypg), 127th in pass defense (296.6 ypg) and 127th in turnovers gained (8). In 2017, his WSU unit ranked 16th in total defense (323.3 ypg), ninth in passing defense (170.9 ypg) and ninth in turnovers gained (28).

Ohio State
In January 2018, Grinch joined Urban Meyer's staff at Ohio State as co-defensive coordinator.

Oklahoma
In January 2019, Grinch joined Lincoln Riley's staff at Oklahoma as defensive coordinator. He spent three years with the Sooners and was able to help a defense that finished 101st in scoring defense and 130th in passing defense, under former defensive coordinator Mike Stoops, who would be fired after giving up 48 points to rival Texas.  In his first year in Norman, OU led the Big 12 in total defense in league play (330.6 ypg) and ranked 17th nationally on the season in opponent third-down conversion percentage (32.2), 32nd in rushing defense (134.1 ypg) and 38th in total defense (356.4 ypg). Grinch transformed the Sooners' defense into a more-than-formidable unit that ranked third nationally in 2020 in interceptions (16; ranked 112th in 2018 with six the year before his arrival at OU), fourth in opponent third-down conversion percentage (27.9; ranked 119th in 2018 at 46.4), seventh in sacks per game (3.4; ranked 74th in 2018 at 2.1), ninth in pass defense efficiency (112.9 rating; ranked 112th in 2018 at 151.9), ninth in rushing defense (105.1 ypg; ranked 59th in 2018 at 159.8), 28th in scoring defense (21.7 ppg; ranked 101st in 2018 at 33.3) and 29th in total defense (350.6 ypg; ranked 114th in 2018 at 453.8).

USC
In November 2021, Grinch followed Riley after he was hired to be the next head coach at USC, serving in the same capacity as before.  In one year at USC he has managed to get a Trojan defensive roster that in 2021 finished as one of the worst units statistically in program history. They previously ranked 103rd in scoring defense and ended that season well below average in all other categories. The current SC defense is ranked 51st in scoring defense, 8th nationally in sacks, 2nd in interceptions, and 37th in tackles for loss.

Personal life
Grinch grew up in Grove City, Ohio and graduated from Grove City High School. In 2003, he married Rebecca Blaser. They have two children. He is the nephew of longtime Missouri head coach Gary Pinkel, under whom Grinch worked as a graduate assistant and safeties coach.

References

External links
 USC profile
 Oklahoma profile
 Washington State profile

1980 births
Living people
American football safeties
Missouri Tigers football coaches
Mount Union Purple Raiders football players
New Hampshire Wildcats football coaches
Ohio State Buckeyes football coaches
Oklahoma Sooners football coaches
USC Trojans football coaches
Washington State Cougars football coaches
Wyoming Cowboys football coaches
University of Missouri alumni
People from Grove City, Ohio
Sportspeople from Columbus, Ohio
Coaches of American football from Ohio
Players of American football from Columbus, Ohio